City of Ainsworth was a paddle steamer sternwheeler that worked on Kootenay Lake in British Columbia, Canada from 1892 to 1898.

In November 1898, she sank during a storm in the worst sternwheeler disaster in Kootenay Lake history. She sank to such a great depth that her wreck would go undiscovered for nearly a century.

Career
City of Ainsworth was launched on May 4, 1892, the third sternwheeler built for service on Kootenay Lake, the first two being Nelson, launched in June 1891, followed by Spokane which worked for the Great Northern Railway. Ainsworth'''s route was from Kaslo to Nelson, stopping along the way at Ainsworth, Pilot Bay and Balfour. In the years following her launch several more sternwheelers were built for Kootenay Lake, among them, Kokanee, Kuskanook and the famous Moyie, which would serve the area for 59 years and be the last commercial sternwheeler to operate in the province as well as one of the very few that were preserved and can still be viewed today. City of Ainsworth, however, faced a far grimmer future.

On November 29, 1898, City of Ainsworth left Nelson for Bonner's Ferry and was caught in a gale-force storm. Loaded down with eight cords of wood on her bow, she began to founder. Passengers and crew were quick to throw the firewood overboard, but then the water rushed down onto her stern and she turned broadside and began to roll in the waves. At one point she rolled over so far that water rushed into her smokestack. The first officer put down one of the two lifeboats, but as soon as five people got in it, it was swamped and four of them were lost in the waves. The second lifeboat was launched with worse results, and another five people were lost. 
One of the lifeboats was regained and Captain Lean, joined by Seaman Donnelly and Engineer Kale rowed four passengers 3.2 km (two miles) through the storm-tossed water and deposited them safely at the shore. The three men made this trip twice more, rescuing all of the remaining passengers, but the final death toll, seven crew members and two passengers, made it the worst sternwheeler disaster on Kootenay Lake. City of Ainsworth sank in 110 m (360 feet) of water and its wreckage would not be discovered until 1990, nearly a century later. Once discovered the wreck was designated an underwater heritage site.

Diving the wreck
In September 1997, several members of the Cambrian Foundation successfully conducted two dives to City of Ainsworth. No previous attempts to dive down to the wreck had been conducted due to its extreme depth, the low visibility in the water and the dangerous surface conditions on Kootenay Lake. The dive team had to decompress for 75 minutes after spending only 10 minutes at the bottom, but they managed to film City of Ainsworth'' and reported that she was mostly intact and sitting upright.

See also
 List of ships in British Columbia
 Moyie (sternwheeler)

Notes

Further reading

External links
 

 

Paddle steamers of British Columbia
Shipwrecks in the British Columbia Interior
1892 ships
Shipwrecks of the Columbia River system
Steamboats of Kootenay Lake